The Pentland Skerries (Old Norse: Pettlandssker) are a group of four uninhabited islands lying in the Pentland Firth, northeast of Duncansby Head and south of South Ronaldsay in Scotland.

By far the largest of the islands is Muckle Skerry, home to two lighthouses, built in 1794. The other islands lie to the south of Muckle Skerry. From west to east, they are Little Skerry, Louther Skerry and Clettack Skerry.

Accidents 
MV Priscilla ran aground on Pentland Skerries on 18 July 2018.

See also

 List of islands of Scotland

References 

Archipelagoes of Scotland
Uninhabited islands of Orkney
Skerries of Scotland